The Danbury Mad Hatters were a professional ice hockey team based in Danbury, Connecticut at the 3,050-seat Danbury Ice Arena.  The Mad Hatters were a member of the Eastern Professional Hockey League.

The Mad Hatters name refers to Danbury's nickname as the "Hat City."  The city was the former center of the hat industry, at one point producing 25% of America's hats.  The "mad" was added to the nickname to differentiate the team from the athletic teams of Danbury High School, and also as a reference to the common colloquial expression, "mad like a hatter.

The team is owned by Col. Tim Kolpien of Corning, New York.  On June 10, 2008, the team announced that former Danbury Trashers defenceman Dave MacIssac would be the head coach of the Mad Hatters.

History

2008-2009
The Danbury Mad Hatters were founded in 2008 as an Eastern Professional Hockey League expansion team. The Mad Hatters had on-ice success during their first season, as they finished their inaugural regular season at 30-18-0-2, finished 3rd and missing the playoffs by 4 pts.  They also finished 2nd in attendance with average attendance 984.

Roster

See also
Professional Hockey In Connecticut

References

External links
 Danbury Mad Hatters 
 Eastern Professional Hockey League

Danbury, Connecticut
Eastern Professional Hockey League (2008–09) teams
Ice hockey teams in Connecticut
Sports in Fairfield County, Connecticut
2008 establishments in Connecticut
Ice hockey clubs established in 2008